Wing Gillette (died 8 September 1996) was a West Indian cricket umpire. He stood in five Test matches between 1948 and 1958. He umpired 14 first-class matches, all of them at the Bourda ground in Georgetown, Guyana, between October 1947 and March 1958.

See also
 List of Test cricket umpires

References

Year of birth missing
1996 deaths
Guyanese cricket umpires
Guyanese emigrants to the United States
West Indian Test cricket umpires